Victor Allred (born 1962/1963) is an American politician who served as a member of the Missouri House of Representatives from 2019 to 2021. He is a member of the Republican party.

References

Living people
1960s births
Republican Party members of the Missouri House of Representatives
21st-century American politicians